No Place for My Dream is a studio album by Nigerian musician Femi Kuti. It was released in June 2013 under Knitting Factory Records.

Track list

References

External links
No Place for My Dream by Femi Kuti at iTunes.com

2013 albums
Knitting Factory Records albums
Femi Kuti albums
Afrobeat albums